Muret – Lherm Aerodrome  is located at Lherm in Haute-Garonne département in Occitanie region at 5 km south-west of Muret.

A campus of the École nationale de l'aviation civile (French civil aviation university) is located on the aerodrome.

Specifications 
 Airfield elevation : 189 meters
 Asphalt runway  : 1 100 m × 30 m
 Grass runway : 825 m × 50 m

Air show 
 Airexpo, yearly air show

References 

Airports in Occitania (administrative region)